Waleed Al-Enezi may refer to:

 Waleed Al-Enezi (footballer, born 1994), Saudi football midfielder
 Waleed Al-Enezi (footballer, born 1996), Saudi Arabian football goalkeeper